True As Steel is a 1924 American silent drama film directed and written by Rupert Hughes which stars Aileen Pringle and Huntley Gordon. The film is about a married businesswoman who has an affair with a married colleague.

Plot
As described in a film magazine review, Frank Parry, a middle-aged, successful manufacturer, goes to New York City. There he becomes infatuated with Mrs. Eva Boutelle, a handsome businesswoman, whose husband Harry is out of town. He offers to secure a divorce if she will do likewise and then marry her. The temptation is strong for Mrs. Boutelle is fascinated by him. However, she remains true to her marriage vows, and the final meeting between the pair results in Eva resolving to remain "true as steel" to her spouse. Parry returns home, remorseful and determined to remain loyal to his faithful wife. He finds that his daughter Ethel has taken up a business career and intends to stick to it, despite her parent's disapproval.

Cast

Preservation
A fragment of True as Steel is preserved in the George Eastman Museum Motion Picture Collection.

References

External links

Still at silenthollywood.com

1924 films
1924 drama films
American silent feature films
American black-and-white films
Goldwyn Pictures films
Silent American drama films
Films directed by Rupert Hughes
Films with screenplays by Rupert Hughes
1920s American films